Fulvio Balatti (3 January 1938 – 28 October 2001) was an Italian rower who competed in the 1960 Summer Olympics and in the 1964 Summer Olympics.

He was born in Mandello del Lario in 1938 and rowed for GS Moto Guzzi.

At the 1958 European Rowing Championships, Balatti rowed for the eight and won gold. At the 1960 Summer Olympics, he was a crew member of the Italian boat that won the bronze medal in the coxed four event. At the 1961 European Rowing Championships, Balatti was back in the eight and won gold. At the 1963 European Rowing Championships, he was part of the coxless four that won silver. At the 1964 European Rowing Championships, his coxless four won bronze. At the 1964 Summer Olympics, he was part of the Italian boat that finished fifth in the coxless four event.

Balatti died on 28 October 2001.

References

1938 births
2001 deaths
Italian male rowers
Olympic rowers of Italy
Rowers at the 1960 Summer Olympics
Rowers at the 1964 Summer Olympics
Olympic bronze medalists for Italy
Sportspeople from the Province of Lecco
Olympic medalists in rowing
Medalists at the 1960 Summer Olympics
European Rowing Championships medalists
People from Mandello del Lario